Spiniductellus flavonigrum is a moth of the family Gelechiidae. It is found in south-eastern Kazakhstan and Kyrgyzstan.

The wingspan is 15–16 mm. The forewings are cream-coloured, mottled with dark brown. The base, apical area and two broad fascia at one-third and two-thirds are dark brown and there is a distinct black spot in the middle of the wing posterior to the fascia at one-third. A cream-yellow fascia is found posterior to the fascia at two-thirds. The hindwings are grey. Adults are on wing from late July to August.

Etymology
The species name refers to the colours of the wing pattern and is derived from Latin flavo (meaning yellow) and nigro (meaning black).

References

Moths described in 2008
Anomologini